El Ahly Mateur is a Tunisian football club based in Mateur, Bizerte Governorate. The club are currently members of Ligue Professionnelle 2.

History
The club was established in 1947  as Association of Mateur Alumni as a club for Tunisian players in order to compete with the French local side l'Espérance de Mateur and the Italian club Juventus Mateur. After Tunisian independence in 1956 its two local rivals folded and the club was renamed En Nadi Ahly Mateur

In 1961–62 the club won the Northern Division of the second tier and were promoted to the top division. They remained in the top flight until finishing bottom in 1965–66, when they were relegated. At the end of the season the club adopted its current name.

Honours
Tunisian Ligue Professionnelle 2
North Division champions 1961–62
Third Division
North Division champions 1973–74, 1979–80, 2008–09
Fourth Division
North Division champions 1992–93, 2005–06

References

Association football clubs established in 1947
Football clubs in Tunisia
1947 establishments in Tunisia
Sports clubs in Tunisia